is a Japanese fashion model. Her management agency is Stardust Promotion, which also manages her younger sister, singer Alice. She is of maternal Spanish descent.

Rie debuted in TV on NTV's variety show Ucchan Nanchan no Urinari! in mid-1990s, and sang in the group McKee on the show, releasing Can't Stop My Heart which charted as high as #28.  She also has appeared in commercial for companies such as Toyota or Sapporo Beverage and in the 2006 movie Memories of Matsuko (though uncredited). Rie appears regularly in fashion magazines as MISS and BAILA, as well as catalogues for several fashion companies in Japan.

In 2007 she appeared on Remioromen's videoclip for Akanezora. In 2009 she married a businessman from Hong Kong. In late 2011, she announced she was pregnant.

References

External links
 Profile at Stardust Promotion
 Rie at BAILA's Model Jam

1980 births
Living people
People from Tokyo
Japanese female models
Japanese people of Spanish descent
Stardust Promotion artists
Models from Tokyo Metropolis